Mats Köhlert (born 2 May 1998) is a German professional footballer and former child actor who plays as a left winger for Eredivisie club Heerenveen.

Club career
In 2016, Köhlert signed his first professional contract with Hamburger SV. He made his professional debut for Hamburg in the 2. Bundesliga on 30 March 2019, coming on as a substitute in the 78th minute for Vasilije Janjičić in the 0–0 away draw against VfL Bochum. On 1 July Köhlert signed a contract at Eredivisie side Willem II after his contract at Hamburger SV had expired. 

On 21 June 2022, Köhlert signed a three-year contract with Heerenveen.

International career
In 2015, Köhlert was included in the Germany U17 national team squad for the 2015 UEFA European Under-17 Championship in Bulgaria. He made four appearances in the tournament, with the team managing to reach the final before losing 4–1 to France. However, the team still managed to qualify for the 2015 FIFA U-17 World Cup in Chile, with Köhlert subsequently included in Germany's squad. He appeared in all four of Germany's matches, with the team being eliminated in the round of 16 after a 2–0 defeat to Croatia.

In 2017, Köhlert was included in Germany's squad for the 2017 UEFA European Under-19 Championship in Georgia. He made one appearance in the tournament, Germany's opening match against the Netherlands, which finished as a 4–1 loss. The team were eliminated in the group stage of the tournament.

Acting career
Köhlert first appeared as a child in commercials for Kinder Chocolate, BMW, IKEA, Smarties, McDonald's and Tchibo. In 2008, he played an uncredited role as a child in the film . In 2009, he appeared as Philipp in the episode "Schwanenmord" of the television series Die Pfefferkörner. Later that year, he played the role of Klein Brakelmann in the episode "Goldene Erinnerungen" of the television series Neues aus Büttenwarder. Köhlert played his first major role at the side of Maria Furtwängler as Uwe in the 2011 television film Schicksalsjahre. In the same year, he took part in the episode "Borowski und der coole Hund" of the German police procedural Tatort.

Filmography

Film

Television

References

External links
 
 
 
 

1998 births
Living people
Footballers from Hamburg
German footballers
Association football wingers
Germany under-21 international footballers
Germany youth international footballers
Hamburger SV II players
Hamburger SV players
Willem II (football club) players
SC Heerenveen players
2. Bundesliga players
Regionalliga players
Eredivisie players
German male television actors
German male film actors
German male child actors
21st-century German male actors
Male actors from Hamburg
German expatriate footballers
Expatriate footballers in the Netherlands
German expatriate sportspeople in the Netherlands